The National Intelligence Law of the People's Republic of China governs China's intelligence and security apparatus. It is the first law made public in China which is related to China's national intelligence agencies. The law however does not specifically name any of the organizations to which it applies such as the Ministry of State Security (MSS) and Ministry of Public Security (MPS). According to the law, "everyone is responsible for state security" which is in line with China's state security legal structure as a whole. The final draft of the law on 16 May 2017 was toned down as compared to previous versions. The National People's Congress passed the law on 27 June 2017. The law was updated on 27 April 2018.

The passage of the National Intelligence Law is part of a larger effort by the Chinese central government to strengthen its security legislation. In 2014, China passed a law on counterespionage, in 2015 a law on national security and another on counter-terrorism, in 2016 a law on cybersecurity and foreign NGO Management, among others.

Provisions 
The most controversial sections of the law include Article 7 which potentially compels businesses registered in the People's Republic of China or have operations in China to hand over information to Chinese intelligence agencies such as the MSS. Article 10 makes the law applicable extraterritorially, having implications for Chinese businesses operating overseas specifically technology companies, compelling them to hand over user data even when operating in foreign jurisdictions and Article 18 elevates and expands the authority of "national intelligence work institutions" exempting personnel from border control measures at key points of entry throughout the country.

Reaction 

Experts argue that the law forces Chinese telecommunications companies with operations overseas such as Huawei to hand over data to Chinese government regardless of which country that data came from. An article published by the Australian Strategic Policy Institute states that numerous laws in China, including the National Intelligence Law, outline that for "Chinese citizens and companies alike, participation in "intelligence work" is a legal responsibility and obligation, regardless of geographic boundaries". To counteract perceived concerns, Huawei, in May 2018, submitted legal opinion by Chinese law firm Zhong Lun, which among other things stated that "Huawei’s subsidiaries and employees outside of China are not subject to the territorial jurisdiction of the National Intelligence Law". A report by Mannheimer Swartling, a Sweden-based law firm, concluded that "NIL applies to all Chinese citizens" and that "NIL applies globally to Chinese Groups [...] all subsidiaries, even those outside China [...]".

References

External links 
 中华人民共和国国家情报法 (National Intelligence Law of the People's Republic of China)

Law of the People's Republic of China
Privacy of telecommunications
2017 in law
2017 in China
Espionage in China
Intelligence gathering law
Ministry of State Security (China)